Le Travail interrompu (English: Work Interrupted) is a painting by nineteenth-century French painter William-Adolphe Bouguereau in 1891. The painting is currently held in the Mead Art Museum in Amherst, Massachusetts.

The painting shows a woman seated beside an urn filled with balls of wool; Cupid is leaning across her shoulders applying perfume to her ear. The delicate luminous colours combined with the barely visible brush strokes are typical of the artist's work.

See also
 William-Adolphe Bouguereau gallery

References

External links
William-Adolphe Bouguereau at the Web Museum

Mythological paintings by William-Adolphe Bouguereau
1891 paintings
Paintings depicting Greek myths
Paintings in Massachusetts
Paintings of Cupid